Leszek Jamroziński is a Polish sprint canoer who competed in the early 1980s. He won a silver medal in the K-4 10000 m event at the 1981 ICF Canoe Sprint World Championships in Nottingham.

References

Living people
Polish male canoeists
Year of birth missing (living people)
Place of birth missing (living people)
ICF Canoe Sprint World Championships medalists in kayak